A-One is a mandopop group created in 2008 under the label Hong Kong Kiss-star entertainment Beijing company (香港Kiss Star娱乐北京有限公司).

Names
A number of names have been used for this group.

 A-One (昆虫一族)
 A-One (昆虫组合)
 A-One (中国昆虫)

Career
Originally Gillian Chung was scheduled to be a performer at the 2008 Summer Olympics opening ceremony.  But due to the Edison Chen photo scandal, director Zhang Yimou had replaced Twins with A-One. A-One did not make their international debut on 8 August as part of the ceremony.

After 2 years of training the group debuted after Hunan Satellite TV show Happy camp (快乐大本营).

Members
The group members are counted as 3+x where the most popular 3 members are in the group.  Sometimes it may have 5 or more members.  There had been 10 members in total.  The official website describe this fan selection style as democratic (民主) for the 21st century.

Album
 Jeet Kune Do (截拳道)

References

External links
 Official site
 Tudou video sample
 Youtube video sample

Chinese musical groups